Kolonia Lipiny  is a village in the administrative district of Gmina Sompolno, within Konin County, Greater Poland Voivodeship, in west-central Poland.

References

Kolonia Lipiny